Feimaņi; is a village in Latgale, in Rēzekne Municipality. Feimaņi is the administrative centre of Feimaņi Parish. It is located 33 kilometers from the municipality centre Rēzekne and 229 kilometers away from the capital city of Latvia, Riga. The population as of 2020 was 298.

History 
According to Geographical Dictionary of the Kingdom of Poland, the village of Feimaņi was first mentioned in 1558. Village was owned by the Korff family until 1715. In the period of Reformation, Korff family switched from Catholicism to Lutheranism and local wooden church was handed to them. In 1708, Jesuit Order took the church back.

Geography 
Feimaņi is located nearby the Feimaņi lake, on its eastern coast. The river Feimanka flows from the lake. Village is 165 meters above the sea level and it is located in the western part of the Latgale Upland.

Transport

Roads 
The European route E262 that connects Kaunas and Ostrov passes nearby the village.

Railway 
In 1860, Feimaņi became a part of the Saint Petersburg–Warsaw railway line. The Krāce Station in the village was opened in 1926.

References 

Rēzekne Municipality
Towns and villages in Latvia